This is a list of what are intended to be the notable top hotels by country, five or four star hotels, notable skyscraper landmarks or historic hotels which are covered in multiple reliable publications. It should not be a directory of every hotel in every country:

Denmark

71 Nyhavn, Copenhagen
Asserbohus
 Bella Center, Copenhagen
Bernstorff Palace, Copenhagen
 Brøndums Hotel, Skagen
 Copenhagen Admiral Hotel, Copenhagen
 DGI-byen, Copenhagen
 Dragsholm Castle, Dragsholm
 Dronninglund Hotel, Dronninglund
Hotel Astoriam Copenhagen
Hotel Bristol, Copenhagen
 Hotel D'Angleterre, Copenhagen
 Hvedholm Castle, Faaborg
 Nimb Hotel, Copenhagen
 Radisson Blu Royal Hotel, Copenhagen, Copenhagen
Radisson SAS HC Andersen Hotel, Odense
Ruth's Hotel, Skagen

Dominica
Evergreen Hotel, Roseau 
Fort Young Hotel, Roseau 
Garraway Hotel, Roseau  	
Sutton Place Hotel, Roseau

Dominican Republic
 Barceló Bávaro Palace Deluxe, Punta Cana
 EdenH Real Arena Hotel, Punta Cana
 Puntacana Resort and Club, Punta Cana

References

D